Ampharete oculicirrata is a sea worm species of the family Ampharetidae first described in June 2019 after its discovery in the West Shetland Shelf Nature Conservation Marine Protected Area. It was discovered by a team of scientists from Joint Nature Conservation Committee and Marine Scotland Science.

References

Terebellida
Fauna of the Atlantic Ocean
Animals described in 2019